Antônio Francisco, usually known by the nickname Nininho (November 6, 1923 – October 8, 1997), is a former association footballer who played striker. He was born in Campinas, São Paulo state.

He played football for the São Paulo state club Portuguesa, among other clubs.

Portuguesa
Nininho scored 115 goals for Portuguesa, and is the club's third all-time goalscorer.

Brazil national football team
Defending the Brazil national team, he played in the 1949 Copa América, and scored three goals.

Nininho had four caps, all of them in 1949 Copa América, scoring three goals.

Honors
Copa América: 1949

References

External links
Biography at Conteúdo Desportivo

1923 births
1997 deaths
Sportspeople from Campinas
Brazilian footballers
Brazil international footballers
Associação Portuguesa de Desportos players
Associação Atlética Ponte Preta players
Copa América-winning players
Association football forwards